Erigeron bellidiastrum, the western daisy fleabane or sand fleabane, is a species of fleabane in the family Asteraceae. It is native to northern Mexico (state of Chihuahua) and the western and central United States (western Great Plains and open sandy areas in the deserts west of the Rockies).

Erigeron bellidiastrum is an annual or biennial herb up to 50 cm (20 inches) tall, with a taproot. It produces flower heads in groups of 1–12 on the ends of branches. Each head can have up to 70 white ray florets surrounding many small disc florets.

Varieties
Erigeron bellidiastrum var. arenarius (Greene) G.L.Nesom - New Mexico, Texas, Chihuahua). 
Erigeron bellidiastrum var. bellidiastrum - Arizona, Colorado, Kansas, Montana, Nebraska, New Mexico, Oklahoma, South Dakota, Texas, Utah, Wyoming
Erigeron bellidiastrum var. robustus Cronquist - Colorado, Kansas, Nebraska, New Mexico, Oklahoma, Texas

References

bellidiastrum
Flora of North America
Plants described in 1840